The Kosrae white-eye (Zosterops cinereus) is a species of bird in the family Zosteropidae. It is endemic to Kosrae Island.  This species and the grey-brown white-eye were formerly considered conspecific.

Its natural habitat is subtropical or tropical moist lowland forest.

References

Kosrae white-eye
Birds of the Federated States of Micronesia
Kosrae white-eye
Kosrae white-eye